Mikhail Alexeevich Anisimov (Russian: Михаил Алексе́евич Анисимов, born November 2, 1941, Baku, Azerbaijan, USSR) is a Russian and American interdisciplinary scientist.

Early life 
Anisimov received a degree in petroleum engineering from Grozny Petroleum Institute in 1964, a doctorate in physical chemistry from Moscow State University in 1969, and a doctor of science degree in molecular and thermal physics from the Kurchatov Institute of Atomic Energy in Moscow in 1976.

Career 
From 1969 through 1977,  Anisimov worked at the U.S.S.R. State Committee for Standards and Product Quality Management (Russian: Госстандарт), where his postdoctoral mentor was Alexander V. Voronel. From 1978 until 1993, Anisimov was a professor and the chairman of the Physics Department of Gubkin Russian State University of Oil and Gas. In 1994, Anisimov began working in the United States as a professor for both the Department of Chemical and Biomolecular Engineering and for the Institute of Physical Science and Technology at the University of Maryland, College Park.

Research  
Anisimov’s field of research is thermodynamics of fluids and fluid mixtures, liquid crystals, polymers, and other soft-matter materials. His research group at the University of Maryland (jointly with Jan V. Sengers ) is one of the leading international authorities in the field of critical phenomena and phase transitions. Anisimov works in theory and experiments, fundamental problems and applications. He has been an author and a co-author of 2 books, 14 book chapters and review articles and more than 400 published journal and encyclopedia articles, conference proceedings and reports.

Personal life 
Anisimov has four children. His eldest daughter, Tanya Anisimova, is a cellist and composer.

Honors and awards
University System of Maryland Board of Regents’ Faculty Award, 2015
Yeram S. Touloukian Award in Thermophysics (American Society of Mechanical Engineers), 2015
Fellow of the American Institute of Chemical Engineers, 2014
Foreign Member of the Russian Academy of Engineering, 2013
Foreign Member of the Russian Academy of Natural Sciences, 2013
Poole and Kent Senior Teaching Award, University of Maryland, College Park, 2007
Foundation for Science and Technology International Award, Gunma University, Japan, 2006 
Member of the International Academy of Refrigeration (Ukrainian Branch), 2003
Fellow of the American Association for the Advancement of Science, 2002
Fellow of the American Physical Society, 1998

Bibliography (partial)
 M. A. Anisimov, “50 years of breakthrough discoveries in fluid criticality”, Int. J. Thermophys. 32, 2001–2009 (2011).

 M. A. Anisimov, V. A. Rabinovich, and V. V. Sychev, "Thermodynamics of the Critical State of Individual Substances", English Edition: CRC Press, Boca Raton, 1995, 171 pages

References

External links
Terpconnect.umd.edu/~anisimov/
Ench.umd.edu/faculty/anisimov/
Lightscatteringcenter.umd.edu/

Living people
1941 births
University of Maryland, College Park faculty
Moscow State University alumni
Fellows of the American Physical Society
Russian physicists
21st-century American physicists